Takekai Shirane (May 25, 1883 – March 5, 1957) was a Japanese politician who served as governor of Hiroshima Prefecture from May to Dec. 1931.

References

Governors of Hiroshima
1883 births
1957 deaths
Japanese Home Ministry government officials